History of Religions (HR) is the first academic journal devoted to the study of comparative religious history. The journal was founded in 1961 by Mircea Eliade. It is currently published by the University of Chicago Press. HR publishes articles that set the standard for the study of religious phenomena from prehistory to modern times, both within particular traditions and across cultural boundaries. In addition to major articles, the journal also publishes review articles and comprehensive book reviews. The journal also occasionally publishes special or theme issues. It is intended for historians of religion, anthropologists, comparative historians, and interdisciplinary scholars of religion.

Access
The entire contents of the journal are available in full-text, searchable electronic databases. All issues except the most recent two years are available on JSTOR; more recent issues are available on the website of the publisher, University of Chicago Press.

Abstracting and indexing
HR is abstracted and indexed in the Arts and Humanities Citation Index, Bibliography of Asian Studies, EBSCOhost, Scopus, and Web of Science.

References

External links 
 History of Religions homepage

Mircea Eliade
English-language journals
Publications established in 1961
Quarterly journals
Religion history journals
Religious studies journals
University of Chicago Press academic journals